The Computer Research Corporation (CRC) was an early developer of minicomputers. It was founded on July 16, 1950.

The founding owners of CRC were Floyd Steele, Donald Eckdahl, Hrant (Harold) Sarkinssian, Richard Sprague, and Irving S. Reed. With the exception of Reed, all members of the CRC had been on the design team for the MADDIDA, a special-purpose digital computer developed from 1946 to 1949 for Northrop. Realizing that a problem-oriented language (POL) could be used to make a general-purpose computer function as a differential analyzer, the MADDIDA design team left Northrup in 1950 to focus on designing general-purpose computers, leading to them to found the CRC. After developing the Cadac, an early minicomputer, the CRC was sold to National Cash Register (NCR) in February 1953, launching NCR into the digital computing business.

Notes

References 
Reilly, Edwin D. (2003). Milestones in Computer and Science History. Greenwood Publishing Group.

American companies established in 1950
American companies disestablished in 1953
Computer companies established in 1950
Computer companies disestablished in 1953
Defunct computer companies of the United States
Defunct computer hardware companies
NCR Corporation